The 1908 Boston College football team was an American football team that represented Boston College as an independent during the 1908  college football season. Led by Joe Kenney and Joe Reilly in their first and only season as co-head coaches, Boston College compiled a record of 2–4–2.

Schedule

References

Boston College
Boston College Eagles football seasons
Boston College football
1900s in Boston